The London Masters was a non-ranking snooker tournament staged between 1989 and 1991. All three editions were held at the Café Royal in London and sponsored by Continental Airlines. Stephen Hendry won both of the first two editions of the event, defeating John Parrott twice in the final by the same score of 4–2. The final event, held in 1991 was won by Steve Davis who defeated Hendry in a whitewash 4–0.

Prize money
The inaugural event in 1989 grand prize was £35,000, before increasing to £40,000 for the following two seasons. There was no prize for the highest break of the tournament.

Winners

References

London Masters (snooker)
Snooker non-ranking competitions
Recurring sporting events established in 1989
Recurring sporting events disestablished in 1991
Defunct snooker competitions